Martin Vögeli  (born 9 July 1995) is a Liechtensteiner cross-country skier who competes internationally.
 
He represented Liechtenstein at the 2018 Winter Olympics.

References

External links

1995 births
Living people
Liechtenstein male cross-country skiers 
Olympic cross-country skiers of Liechtenstein 
Cross-country skiers at the 2018 Winter Olympics 
Cross-country skiers at the 2012 Winter Youth Olympics